Zuffi is an Italian surname. Notable people with the surname include:

Ambrogio Zuffi (1833–1922), Italian sculptor
Dario Zuffi (born 1964), Swiss footballer and coach
Luca Zuffi (born 1990), Swiss footballer, son of Dario
Piero Zuffi (1919–2006), Italian set designer and painter

Italian-language surnames